Snertingegård, also known simply as Snertinge, is a manor house and estate located just north of Vordingborg, in southeastern Denmark. It was one of 12 manors established after Vordingborg Cavalry District was dissolved in 1884. The Renaissance Revival style main building  and home farm were built for Defence Minister Christian Frederik Hansen in 1857 from designs by Ferdinand Meldahl. Both buildings were listed on the Danish registry of protected buildings and places in 1978.

History

Early history
 
In 1774, Vordingborg Cavalry District was divided into 12 estates and sold in public auction. Snertingegård was sold to the wealthy merchant Reinhard Iselin from Copenhagen. He was also the buyer of Vordingborg Castle (renamed rosenfeldt), Ladegård (renamed Iselingen and Avnøgård.

1852-1905: Hansen family
 
In 1804, Iseling's heirs sold Snertingegård, Iselingen and Marienborg to Hans Henrik Peter Reiersen (27 May 1750 - 29 July 1805). In 1810, he sold Snertingegård to S. Busk. After Busk's death in 1833, it was acquired by P. Lund.  His widow, Sophie Lund, sold Snertingegård to Christian Frederik Hansen in 1852. He served as Minister of Defence in several governments. Nicoline Marie Berggren, who is believed to have been the illegitimate daughter of Bertel Thorvaldsen, grew up on the Snertingegård estate. Her mother, who had met Thorvaldsen at Nysø Manor, her previous workplace, worked for Hansen.

Hansen's son Christian Frederik Gustav Hansen inherited he estate after his father's death. He was in turn succeeded by his own son, Edward Joachim Hansen. Edward Joachim Hansen's daughter, Agnes Nikoline Hansen, who was born on the estate in 1893, married the zoologist and educator Holger Valdemar Brøndsted.

20th century
In 1905, Snertingegård was acquired by Ludvig Munthe Brun. His widow, Meta Brun, née Nielsen, sold it to P.F. Thymann in 1930.

Architecture
The main building dates from 1856-1857 and was designed by Ferdinand Meldahl with inspiration from Renaissance architecture. The building is constructed in red brick and stands on a foundation of boulders. It consists of a two-storey main wing with a short side wing. Towards the courtyard is a centrally placed quadratic tower topped by a dome.

Surroundings
Snertingegård is surrounded by a large garden.

In Snertinge Mose, a bogland, is an important settlement from the Maglemosian culture (9,000-6,4000 b.c.). A large number tools of bone and flint as well as numerous animal bones from aurochs, moose, red deer and wild boar has been retrieved from the site.

Today
Snertingegård was purchased by Klaus Birger Liljegren Jønsson in 2004. He has previously been the owner of Fodbygaard at Nøstved.

List of owners
 ( -1774) Kronen 
 (1774-1781) Reinhard Iselin 
 (1781-1804) Estate of Reinhard Iselin 
 (1804-1810) Hans Henrik Peter Reiersen 
 (1810-1833) S. Busk 
 (1833- ) P. Lund 
 ( -1852) Sophie Lund 
 (1852-1873) Christian Frederik Hansen
 (1873-1875) Estate of Christian Frederik Hansen 
 (1875-1899) G. Hansen 
 (1899-1905) Hairs of  G. Hansen 
 (1905-1927) Ludvig Munthe Brun 
 (1927-1930) Meta Brun, née Nielsen
 (1930-1954) P.F. Thymann 
 (2004- ) Klaus Birger Liljegren Jønsson

References 

Manor houses in Vordingborg Municipality
Listed buildings and structures in Vordingborg Municipality
Listed castles and manor houses in Denmark
Renaissance Revival architecture in Denmark
Houses completed in 1857